Cours-la-Ville is a former commune in the Rhône department in eastern France. It is the seat of the commune of Cours.

History
It was formed in 1974 by the merger of Cours and La Ville. On 1 January 2016, Cours-la-Ville, Pont-Trambouze and Thel merged becoming one commune called Cours.

International relations

Cours-la-Ville is twinned with:

 Winslow, United Kingdom

See also
Communes of the Rhône department

References

Former communes of Rhône (department)
Beaujolais (province)